Telmatherina albolabiosus is a species of fish in the subfamily Telmatherininae part of the family Melanotaeniidae, the rainbowfishes. It is endemic to Indonesia where it occurs only in Lake Matano on the island of Sulawesi.

Sources

albolabiosus
Fish described in 2008